A Sense of Wonder is the fifteenth studio album by Northern Irish singer-songwriter Van Morrison released in 1985. On first release, original pressings had to be recalled when the W. B. Yeats estate refused to allow Morrison's musical version of the poem "Crazy Jane on God" to be included, as they believed his poems should only be set to classical music. Morrison substituted "If You Only Knew" for the Yeats' recording. (Later, perhaps due to Morrison's efforts, Yeats poems would be put to rock settings on a whole album).

The 29 January 2008 reissued and remastered version of the album contains alternate takes of "Crazy Jane on God" and "A Sense of Wonder".

Track listing
All songs written by Van Morrison unless stated otherwise.

Side one
 "Tore Down a la Rimbaud" – 4:09
 "Ancient of Days" – 3:37
 "Evening Meditation" – 4:13
 "The Master's Eyes" – 4:01
 "What Would I Do" (Ray Charles) – 5:10

Side two
 "A Sense of Wonder" – 7:09
 "Boffyflow and Spike"  – 3:06
 "If You Only Knew" (Mose Allison) – 2:56
 "Let the Slave (Incorporating the Price of Experience)" (William Blake, Adrian Mitchell, Mike Westbrook) – 5:26
 "A New Kind of Man" – 3:21

Bonus tracks (2008 CD reissue)
 "Crazy Jane on God" – 3:50 (Alternate take) (William Mathieu, Morrison, William Butler Yeats)
 "A Sense of Wonder" – 6:06 (Alternate take)

Personnel

Musicians
Van Morrison – guitar, piano, vocals
John Allair – Hammond organ
Bob Doll – trumpet
Tom Donlinger – drums
Pee Wee Ellis – tenor saxophone
David Hayes – Bass guitar
Pauline Lazano – backing vocals
Chris Michie – guitar
Bianca Thornton – backing vocals
Moving Hearts – group, performer on "A Sense of Wonder" and "Boffyflow and Spike"

Production
Producer and director: Van Morrison
Mixing: Jim Stern and Mick Glossop
Project coordination: John Walter
Sleeve design and art direction: Andrew Plewett
Cover art: Torchlight, London
Photography: Paul Cox
Horn arrangements: Pee Wee Ellis

Charts

Notes

References
Hinton, Brian (1997). Celtic Crossroads: The Art of Van Morrison, Sanctuary, 

Van Morrison albums
1985 albums
Albums produced by Van Morrison
Mercury Records albums
Polydor Records albums